Agarivorans is a genus in the phylum Pseudomonadota (Bacteria).

Etymology
The name Agarivorans derives from:New Latin neuter gender noun agarum, agar; Latin participle adjective vorans, devouring; New Latin masculine gender noun (New Latin masculine gender participle adjective used as a substantive) agarivorans, agar-devouring.

Species
The genus contains 4 species, namely
 A. aestuarii ( Kim et al. 2016 )
 A. albus ( Kurahashi and Yokota 2004,  (Type species of the genus).; Latin masculine gender adjective albus, white.)
 A. gilvus ( Du et al. 2011, ; Latin masculine gender adjective gilvus, pale yellow, referring to the pale yellow pigmentation of the bacterium.)
 A. litoreus ( Park et al. 2015 )

See also
 Bacterial taxonomy
 Microbiology

References 

Bacteria genera
Alteromonadales